Striped manakin refers to birds that are now recognized as two distinct species:

Kinglet manakin (Machaeropterus regulus)
Striolated manakin (Machaeropterus striolatus)

Birds by common name